Massalongo is an Italian surname. Notable people with the surname include:

Abramo Bartolommeo Massalongo (1824–1860), Italian paleobotanist and lichenologist
Caro Benigno Massalongo (1852–1928), Italian botanist; son of Abramo Bartolommeo Massalongo

Italian-language surnames